List of abbreviations, acronyms and initials related to military subjects such as modern armour, artillery, infantry, and weapons, along with their definitions.

A
 a – army
 AA – anti-aircraft
 AA – AEGIS Ashore
 AAA – anti-aircraft artillery "Triple A"
 AAAV – Advanced Amphibious Assault Vehicle
 AAD – Armoured amphibious dozer
 AADC – Area Air Defense Commander
 AAG – Anti-aircraft gun
 AAK – Appliqué armor kit (US)
 AAN – Army after next
 AAP – Advance Authority to Procure
 AAPC – advanced armoured personnel carrier (Turkey)
 AARADCOM – Army Armament Research and Development Command
 AAR – After Action Review
 AAV – Amphibious assault vehicle
 AAV – Assault Amphibious Vehicle
 AAW – Anti-Aircraft Warfare
 AAWC – Anti-Aircraft Warfare Coordinator
 AB – Air burst
 ABC – Atomic, biological, chemical (replaced by chemical, biological, radiological (CBR), and Nuclear, Biological, Chemical (NBC))
 ABC – Automatic brightness control
 AB(C) – Aviation battalion (combat)
 ABIT – Advanced Built-In Test
 ABM – Air Bursting Munition
 ABM – Anti-Ballistic Missile
 ABMD – AEGIS Ballistic Missile Defense
 ABMS – air bursting ammunition system
 ABRO – Army Base Repair Organisation
 ABS – Aww-Busting System
 ABS – anti-skid braking system
 ABSP – AEGIS Ballistic Missile Defense (BMD) Signal Processor
 ABSV – Armoured Battlegroup Support Vehicle
 A/C – aircraft commander
 AC – alternating current
 ACA – ammunition container assembly
 ACADA' – Automatic Chemical Agent Detector and Alarm
 ACAVP – Advanced Composite Armoured Vehicle Platform (UK)
 ACB – Advanced Capability Build
 ACB/TI – Advanced Capability Baseline/Technical Insertion
 ACC – AEGIS Computer Center
 ACCE – Abrams/Crusader Common Engine
 ACCV – Armored Cavalry Cannon Vehicle (US)
 ACD – Automated Common Diagrams
 ACE – Armored Combat Earthmover (US)
 ACEGIO – Advanced Conversion Equipment Group Input Output
 ACH – Advanced Combat Helmet (MICH TC-2000 Combat Helmet)
 ACLOS – Automatic Command to Line of Sight
 ACM – Acoustic Countermeasures
 ACOG – Advanced Combat Optical Gunsight
 ACOMMS – Acoustic Communications
 ACP – Automatic Colt Pistol
 ACP – Alignment control Panel
 ACPU – Aft Central Processing Unit
 ACR – Advanced Combat Rifle
 ACR – Armored cavalry regiment
 ACRV – Armoured command and reconnaissance vehicle
 ACS – Artillery communications system
 ACS – AEGIS Combat System
 ACS – Air Control Supervisor
 ACSC' – AEGIS Combat Systems Center
 ACTS – AEGIS Combat Training System
 ACU – Army Combat Uniform
 ACU – Antenna Coupler Unit
 ACV – Aardvark Clearing Vehicle
 ACV – Armoured combat vehicle
 ACVT – Armored Combat Vehicle Technology Program (US)
 A/D – Analog to Digital
 ADA – air defense artillery
 ADAM – Area Denial Artillery Munition
 ADAMS – Air Defense Advanced Mobile System (US)
 ADAP – Advanced Digital Antenna Production
 ADATS – Air Defence Anti-Tank System
 ADC-A – Assistant Division Commander – Fire and Maneuver
 ADC-B – Assistant Division Commander – Combat Support
 ADEA – Army Development and Employment Agency
 ADF – Australian Defence Force
 ADG' – Acoustic Display Generator
 ADI – Australian Defence Industries
 ADM – Advanced Development Model
 ADM – Acquisition Decision Memorandum [US]
 ADNS – Automated Digital Network System
 ADS – Advanced Display System
 AE – action express
 AECU – Antenna Environmental Control Unit
 AEF – Allied expeditionary force
 AEP – Action Entry Panel
 AER – Alteration Equivalent to Repair
 AESA – Active electronically scanned array
 AEWC – Airborne Early Warning and Control
 AEV – Armoured engineer vehicle
 AF – Air force
 AF – And Following (as "in DDG-113 AF ships will receive the AMDR Radar")
 AFA/ARA – Aerial field artillery/aerial rocket artillery (US, Vietnam war era attack helicopter batteries employing 2.75 in. FFAR)
 AFARV – Armored, Forward Area, Re-arm Vehicle (US)
 AFAS – Advanced Field Artillery System
 AFATDS – Advanced Field Artillery Tactical Data System
 AFC – Australian Flying Corps
 AFCS – automatic fire-control systems
 AFD – automatic feeding device
 AFDL – Advanced Flight Deck Lighting
 AFFF – Aqueous Fire Fighting Foam (smothers fire cutting off oxygen)
 AFSC – Air Force Specialty Code
 AFSV – armoured fire support vehicle
 AFV – Armored Family of Vehicles (US)
 AFV – Armoured fighting vehicle
 AGC – automatic gain control
 AGF – Army Ground Forces
 AGL – Above Ground Level
 AGL – automatic grenade launcher
 AGLS – automatic gun laying system
 AGS – Armored Gun System (US)
 AGS – advanced gun system
 AGV – assault gun vehicle
 AGVT – Advanced Ground Vehicle Technology
 Ah – Ampere hour
 AHC – Attack Helicopter Company (USA)
 AHE – Aircraft Handling Equipment
 AI – Action Item
 AIC – Air Intercept Controller (US Navy)
 AICS – Accuracy International Chassis System
 AICW – Advanced Individual Combat Weapon
 AIF – Australian Imperial Force (Australia, WWI or WWII)
 AIFS – Advanced Indirect Fire System
 AIFV – Armoured infantry fighting vehicle
 AIPS – Advanced Integrated Propulsion System (US)
 AIS – Automatic Identification System (US NAVY)
 AIT – Alteration Installation Team
 AIT – Advanced Information Technology
 AK – Acknowledgement
 ALAAVS – Advanced Light Armored/Amphibious Vehicle System (US)
 ALC – Advanced Land Combat (US)
 ALICE – All-purpose Lightweight Individual Carrying Equipment
 ALO – AEGIS Light Off
 ALS – Advanced laying system
 ALS – Advanced Lighting System (flight deck)
 ALSV – Armoured logistics support vehicle
 ALT – Armoured launching turret
 ALWT – Advanced Lightweight Torpedo
 AM – Acquisition Manager
 AMC – United States Army Materiel Command
 AMC – Advanced Mortar Carrier (Turkey)
 AMCCOM – Armament Munitions and Chemical Command
 AMDR – Air and Missile Defense Radar
 AMDS – Anti-Missile Discarding Sabot
 AMF – Amphibische Mehrzweck-Fahrzeuge (multipurpose amphibious vehicle)
 AML – Automitrailleuse Légère (light armoured car)
 AMLCD – Active-matrix liquid crystal display
 AMN - Afghanistan Mission Network
 AMOS – Advanced mortar system
 AMPS – Afloat Master Planning System (US NAVY)
 AMR – Anti-materiel rifle
 AMR – Automitrailleuse de Reconnaissance
 AMRWS – Advanced multi-role weapon station
 AMS – Armoured mortar system
 AMS-H –  Advanced Missile System – Heavy
 AMX – Atelier de Construction d'Issy-les-Moulineaux
 ANAD – Anniston Army Depot
 ANZAC – Australia and New Zealand Army Corps
 ANZUS – Australia New Zealand United States Treaty
 AO – Area of operations
 AOI – Arab Organisation for Industrialisation
 AOS – Add-on stabilisation
 AP – Anti-personnel
 AP – Armour-piercing
 APAM – Anti-personnel, anti-matériel
 APBC – Armour-Piercing Ballistic Cap
 APC – Army Personnel Centre
 APC – Armoured personnel carrier
 APC – Armour-piercing capped
 APCBC – Armour-piercing capped ballistic cap
 APC-T – Armour-piercing capped – tracer
 APCT-BF – Armour-piercing capped tracer – base fuze
 APCNR – Armour-piercing composite non-rigid
 APCR – Armour-piercing composite rigid
 APCRBC – Armour-piercing composite rigid ballistic cap
 APDS – Armour-piercing discarding sabot
 APDS-T – Armour-piercing discarding sabot – tracer
 APE – Amphibisches Pionier-Erkundungsfahrzeug (amphibious front-line reconnaissance vehicle)
 APEP – Armour-Piercing Enhancement Programme
 APERS – Anti-personnel
 APERS-T – Anti-personnel tracer
 APFIDS – Armour-piercing fragmentation incendiary discarding sabot
 APFSDS – Armour-piercing fin-stabilised discarding sabot
 APFSDS-T – Armour-piercing fin-stabilised discarding sabot – tracer
 APFSDS(P) – Armour-piercing fin-stabilised discarding sabot (practice)
 APFSDSDU – Armour-piercing fin-stabilised discarding sabot, depleted uranium
 APG – Aberdeen Proving Grounds
 APGM – Autonomous precision-guided munition
 APHC – Armour-piercing hard core
 APHE – Armour-piercing high-explosive
 API – Armour-piercing incendiary
 APIT – Armour-piercing incendiary tracer
 APM – Anti-personnel mine
 APS – Advanced propulsion system
 APS – Artillery pointing system
 APSA – Armour-piercing secondary effect
 APSE – Armour-piercing secondary effect
 APSE-T – Armour-piercing secondary effect – tracer
 APT – Armour-piercing tracer
 APTE – Abrams Power Train Evolution (US)
 APU – Auxiliary power unit
 APV – Armoured patrol vehicle
 AR – ArmaLite rifle
 AR/AAV – Armored Reconnaissance/Airborne Assault Vehicle (US)
 ARD – Anti-reflective device
 ARDEC – Armament Research, Development and Engineering Center
 ARDNOT – Automatic day/night optical tracker
 ARE – Atelier de Construction Roanne
 ARETS – Armour Remote Target System
 ARFORGEN – Army force generation
 ARM – Anti-radiation missile
 ARMAD – Armoured and Mechanised Unit Air Defence
 ARMSCOR – Armament Manufacturing Corporation (South Africa)
 ARMVAL – Anti-armor vehicle evaluation (US)
 ARP – Anti-radiation projectile
 ARP – Armoured repair plates
 ARRADCOM – Armament Research and Development Command
 ARRV – Armoured repair and recovery vehicle
 ARSV – Armored Reconnaissance Scout Vehicle (US)
 ART – Armoured Recon Transport
 ARV – Armoured recovery vehicle or Armed Robotic Vehicle (XM1219)
 ASA – Advanced security agency
 ASAP – As soon as possible
 ASARC – Army Systems Acquisition Review Council
 ASCOD – Austrian Spanish Co-operative Development
 ASM – Air-to-Surface Missile
 ASP – Automatic, self-powered
 ASTROS – Artillery Saturation Rocket System (Brazil)
 ASV – Armored Security Vehicle (US)
 ASV – Ammunition supply vehicle
 AT – Anti-tank
 AT – Ape tape
 ATACS – Advanced tank cannon system (US)
 ATAS – Automatic target acquisition system
 ATCAS – Advanced towed cannon system
 ATD – Advanced technology demonstration
 ATD – Advanced technology demonstrator (US)
 ATD – Automatic target detection
 ATDT – Automatic target detection and tracking
 ATDU – Armoured Trials and Development Unit (UK)
 ATFCS – Automated Targeting and Fire Control System
 ATG – Anti-tank gun
 ATGL – Anti-tank grenade launcher
 ATGM – Anti-tank guided missile
 ATGW – Anti-tank guided weapon
 ATK – Alliant Techsystems
 ATLAS – Advanced technology light artillery system
 ATLV – Artillery target location vehicle
 ATM – Anti-tank mine
 ATR – - EDS Automotive test rig – Electric drive system
 ATS – Atelier de Construction de Tarbes
 ATTC – All Terrain Tracked Carrier
 ATTS – Air Transportable Towed System
 ATV –  All-terrain vehicle
 ATV – Armoured TOW vehicle (Turkey)
 AUG – Armee Universal Gewehr
 AVGP – Armoured Vehicle General Purpose (Canada)
 AVH – Armoured Vehicle Heavy
 AVL – Armoured Vehicle Light
 AVLB – Armoured vehicle-launched bridge
 AVM – Armoured Vehicle Medium
 AVR – Armoured vehicle reconnaissance
 AVRE – Armoured Vehicle Royal Engineers (UK)
 AVT – Advanced Vehicle Technologies (US)
 AWE – Advanced Warfighting Experiment
 AWOL – Absent without official leave
 APC - Armored Personnel Carrier

B
 BAe – British Aerospace
 BAI – Battlefield Air interdiction
 BAMCIS – Begin the Planning, Arrange Recon, Make Recon, Complete Planning, Issue Order, Supervise
 BAR – M1918 Browning Automatic Rifle
 BARCAP – Barrier Combat Air Patrol
 BARV – Beach Armoured Recovery Vehicle
 BASE – British Aerospace Systems and Equipment
 BATES – Battlefield Artillery Target Engagement System
 BAT – Biometrics Automated Toolset
 BB – Base bleed
 BB - Battleship
 BBSP – Blowback shifted pulse
 BC – Battery commander
 BC – Battlecruiser
 BCC – battery control centre
 BCP – Battery command post
 BCT – Brigade combat team (US)
 BCT – Basic combat training
 BCV – Battle command vehicle
 BD – base detonating
 BDA – Browning double action or bomb damage assessment
 BDM – Bunker defeat munition
 BDU – Battle dress uniform
 BE – Base ejection
 BFA – Blank-firing adaptor or blank-firing attachment
 BFV – Bradley Fighting Vehicle
 BG – Border guard
 bhp – Brake horsepower
 BIFF – Battlefield identification friend or foe
 BILL – Bofors, infantry, light and lethal, referring to RBS 56 BILL or RBS 56B BILL 2
 BITE – Built-in test equipment
 BL – Blank
 BL-T – Black tracer
 BLITS – Beta lighted infantry telescope system
 BLT – Battalion landing team
 BLR – Blindado Ligero de Ruedas 
BM – Brigade Major
 BMF – Belgian Mechanical Fabrication
 BMNT – Begin morning nautical twilight
 BMP – Pronounced "bimp".  Former Warsaw Pact IFVs including BMP-1, BMP-2, BMP-3, etc.
 BMR – Blindado Medio de Ruedas
 BMS – Battalion mortar system
 BMS – Battlefield management system
 BNCC (USAF) – Base network control center
 BNS – BILL night sight
 BOCV – Battery operations centre vehicle
 BOG-Dwell – Boots on the ground – dwell (down time)
 BOL – Bearing-only launch
 BOLTS – Bolt-on loading tray system
 BOSS – Ballistic optimizing shooting system
 BPS – Battery power source
 BSB –  Brigade support battalion
 BSP – Bright source protection
 BSSG – Brigade service support group
 BST – Basic skills trainer
 BT – Boat tail
 BT – Bullet trap
 BTA – Best technical approach
 BTRY – Battery
 BTU – Bullet trap universal
 BUA – BILL under armour or built-up area
 BW – Biological warfare
 BX – Bionix AFV

C
 C2 – Command and Control
 C3I – Command, control, communications, and intelligence
 C4 – Composition C-4
 C4ISTAR – Command, control, communications, computers, intelligence, surveillance, target acquisition, and reconnaissance
 C5I – Command, control, communications, computers, collaboration and intelligence
 C6ISR – command, control, communications, computers, cyber-defense, combat systems and intelligence, surveillance, and reconnaissance
 CAB – Combat aviation battalion
 CAB - Combat Action Badge
 CAD – Computer-assisted design
 CAG – Commander Air Group
 CAL – Canadian Arsenals Limited
 CAP – Civil air patrol (USAF civilian auxiliary)
 CAP – Combat air patrol
 CAP – Combustible augmented plasma
 CAP – Covering Agent Program
 CARRV – Challenger armoured repair and recovery vehicle
 CAS – Close air support
 CASEVAC – Casualty evacuation
 CAT/FCS – Command adjusted trajectory/fire-control system (US)
 CAT/LCV – Combined arms team/lightweight combat vehicle (US)
 CATT – Combined arms tactical trainer (UK)
 CATT-B – Component Advanced Technology TestBed (US)
 CAV – Composite armored vehicle (US)
 CAWS – Cannon Artillery Weapons Systems (US)
 CAX – Combined Arms Exercise
 CB – Heavy Cruiser
 CBR – Chemical, biological, radiological
 CBRNE – Chemical, biological, radiological, nuclear, explosive
 CCC – Combustible cartridge case
 CCD – Charge-coupled device
 CCIP – Constantly computed impact point
 CCO – Close combat optic
 CCP - Casualty Collection Point
 CCP – Computer control panel
 CCR – Crown copyright reserved
 CCTV – Closed-circuit television
 CCU – Central control unit
 CCV – Close combat vehicle
 CCV – Command and control vehicle (US)
 CCV-L – Close combat vehicle – light
 cd – candela
 CDA – Combat defensive action
 CDM – Coastal defence missile
 CDU – Command display unit
 CDU – Computer display unit
 CE – Chemical energy
 C/E – Crew/enlisted (enlisted aircrew member)
 CECOM – Communications-electronics command
 CEFO – Combat equipment fighting order (webbing contents)
 CENTCOM – Central Command
 CENTO – Central Treaty Organisation or Baghdad Pact
 CEOI –  Communications electronics operating instruction
 CEP – Circular error probable
 CES – Engineer Services Regiment (Sri Lanka)
 CEPP – Controlled effect police projectile
 CET – Combat engineer tractor
 CEU – Computer electronics unit
 CEV – Combat engineer vehicle
 CF – Canadian Forces
 CF – Controlled fragmentation
 CFE – Conventional forces Europe
 CFV – Cavalry fighting vehicle (US)
 CG – Commanding general
 CGS – Crew gunnery simulator
 CHA – Cast homogeneous armour
 CHARM – Challenger Chieftain armament
 CHIP – Challenger improvement programme
 CIFV – Composite infantry fighting vehicle
 CILAS – Compagnie Industrielle des Lasers
 CINC – Commander In-Chief
 CIP – Combat Identification Panel
 CIS – Chartered Industries of Singapore
 CIS – Commonwealth of Independent States
 CITV – Commander's independent thermal viewer (US)
 CIWS – Close-in weapons system
 CL – Light Cruiser
 CLAMS – Clear lane marking system (US)
 CLASS – Computerised Laser Sight System
 CLAWS – Close combat light armor weapon system (US)
 CLGP – Cannon-launched guided projectile (US)
 CLOS – Command to line of sight
 CLU – Command launch unit as used in FGM-148 Javelin
 CM – Colour-marking or "continue mission"
 CMS – Common missile system
 CMS – Compact modular sight
 CMT – Cadmium–mercury telluride
 CMV – Combat mobility vehicle (US)
 CNVD – Clip-on night vision device
 COA – Course Of Action
 COB – Close of Business
 CO – Commanding officer
 COG – Course over ground
 COMVAT – Combat vehicles armament technology (US)
 COMZ – Communications zone
 COP – Combat outpost
 COS – Chief of section
 COSCOM – Corps support command (US Army)
 CofS – Chief of staff
 COTAC – Conduite de Tir Automatique pour Char (tank automatic fire)
 COTS – Commercial-off-the-shelf
 COV – Counter obstacle vehicle (US)
 CP - Command Post
 CP – Concrete-piercing
 CPR – Common practice round
 CPS – Cardinal points specification (UK)
 CPV – Command post vehicle
 CQB – Close quarters battle
 CQBR – Close-quarters battle receiver
 CR – Capability requirement
 CR – Sri Lanka Army Commando Regiment
 CRISAT – Collaborative Research into Small Arms Technology
 CRM – Composite risk management (US)
 CROWS – Common Remotely Operated Weapon Station
 CRR – Carro de Reconhecimento Sobre Rodas (reconnaissance tracking scout car)
 CRT – Cathode ray tube
 CRU – Cable reel unit
 CS – Communications subsystem
 CS – Confined space
 CS – Communications squadron (USAF)
 CSB – Combat Support Boat
 CSF – Combined service forces
 CSI – computer-synthesised image
 CSS – Computer sighting system
 CSSD – Combat service support detachment
 CTA – Case telescoped ammunition
 CTD – Concept technology demonstrator
 CTI – Central tyre inflation
 CTIS – Central tyre inflation system
 CTO – Central Treaty Organisation or Baghdad Pact
 CTR – Close Target Recce
 CTRA – Carro de Transporte Sobre Rodas Anfibo (amphibious tracking scout car)
 CTT – Challenger training tank
 CUOPS - Current Operations 
 CV – Aircraft Carrier
 CV90 – Combat Vehicle 90
 CVAST – Combat vehicle armament system technology (US)
 CVR(T) – Combat vehicle reconnaissance (tracked) (UK)
 CVR(W) – Combat vehicle reconnaissance (wheeled) (UK)
 CVRDE – Combat vehicle research and development establishment (India)
 CVT – Controlled variable time
 CVTTS – Combat vehicle targeting system
 CW – Chemical warfare
 CWR – Continuous wave radar
 CWS – Cupola weapon station

D
 DA – double action
 DAHA – dual-axis head assembly
 DAO – double action only
 DARCOM – US Army Matériel Development and Readiness Command
 DAREOD – damaged airfield reconnaissance explosive ordnance disposal
 DARPA – Defense Advanced Research Projects Agency (US)
 DAS – deep air support
 DAS – defensive aids system/suite
 DASP – demountable artillery surveillance pod
 DC – direct current
 DCA – défense contre avions (anti-aircraft)
 DCCT – dismounted close combat trainer
 DD – Detroit Diesel
 DD – Destroyer
 DDA – Detroit Diesel Allison
 DDS – Department of Defense Support
 DDU – digital display unit
 DEAD – Destruction of Enemy Air Defense
 DECA – digital electronic control assembly
 DEFA – direction des études et fabrications d'armement
 DERA – Defence Evaluation and Research Agency (UK)
 DESO – Defence Export Sales Organisation (UK)
 DFAC – Dining Facility (US)
 DFCS – digital fire-control system
 DFSV – direct fire support vehicle
 DFV – desert fighting vehicle
 DDG – Guided Missile Destroyer
 DG - Door Gunner (Helicopter)
 DHSS – data handling subsystem
 DIA – Defense Intelligence Agency (US)
 DICON – Defence Industries Corporation of Nigeria
 DIP – driver instrument panel
 DISA – Defense Information Systems Agency
 DISCOM – division support command
 DIVARTY – division artillery
 DMC – digital magnetic compass
 DMR – Designated marksman rifle
 DMU – distance measurement unit
 DNRS – day/night range sight
 DoD – Department of Defense (US)
 DOIM – Directorate of Information Management (US Army)
 DOP – Department of Productivity
 DP – demonstration purpose
 DP – dual purpose
 DPA – Defence Procurement Agency (UK)
 DPICM – Dual-Purpose Improved Conventional Munition (US)
 DPTR – diopter
 DRA – Defence Research Agency (UK)
 DROPS – demountable rack offloading and pick-up system
 DROS – Date of Return Overseas (US)
 DS/T – practice discarding sabot/tracer
 DSACS – direct support armored cannon system (US)
 DSETS – direct support electrical test system
 DSO – Defence Sales Organisation
 DSRV – Deep Submergence Rescue Vehicle (US)
 DSWS – Division Support Weapon System
 DTAT – Direction Technique des Armements Terrestres
 DTT – driver training tank
 DU – depleted uranium
 DV – demining vehicle
 DVE – driver's vision enhancer
 DWFK – deep water fording kit
 DZ – drop zone

E
 EAAK – Enhanced Appliqué Armor Kit (US)
 EAS – End of Active Service
 EAOS – Enhanced Artillery Observation System
 EBG – Engin Blindé Génie (armoured combat vehicle)
 EBR – Engin Blindé de Reconnaissance (armoured reconnaissance vehicle)
 EBRC – Engine Blindé à roues de Contact
 EC – Enhanced Carbine
 ECB – Engineering and Construction Bulletins
 ECM – Electronic countermeasures
 ECOS – Enhanced Combat Optical Sight
 ECS – Environmental Control Subsystem
 ECV – Enhanced Capacity Vehicle
 EDD – Explosive Detonation Disruption
 EDS – Electric Drive System
  – Etablissement d'Etudes et de Fabrications d'Armement de Bourges
 EFC – equivalent full charge
 EFCR – equivalent full charge rounds
 EFM – Explosives Factory Maribyrnong
 EFP – Expanded Feasibility Phase
 EFP – Explosively Formed Penetrator
 EFV – Expeditionary Fighting Vehicle (New name for AAAV)
 EFVS – Electronic Fighting Vehicle System (US)
 EG – External Gun
 EGLM – Enhanced Grenade Launcher Module
 EI – Engineering and Installation
 EIS – Engineering and Installation Squadron
 EI SIT – Engineering and Installation Site Implementation Team
 ELB – Extended Life Barrel
 ELEC – Electrical, Electric
 ELEK - Electronic
 ELEX – Electronics
 ELKE – Elevated Kinetic Energy Weapon (US)
 ELSAP – Elektronische Schiessanlage für Panzer (electronic fire system for tanks)
 EM – electromagnetic
 EMALS – Electromagnetic Aircraft Launcher System
 EMC – Executive Management Committee
 EMD – Engineering and Manufacturing Development
 EMDG – Euromissile Dynamics Group
 EMEW – Electromagnet Explosive Warhead
 EMG – externally mounted gun
 EMP – electromagnetic pulse
 EMPG – Electromagnetic Pulse Grenade
 ENGESA – Engesa Engenheiros Especializados (Brazil)
 EOC – Essential Operational Capability
 EOD – Explosive Ordnance Disposal
 EOR – Explosive Ordnance Reconnaissance
 EOTS – Electro-Optical Targeting System
 EOW - End of Watch
 EPC – Electronic plane conversion
 EPC – Engin Principal de Combat (future main battle tank)
 EPG – Enhanced Performance Grenade
 EPG – European Production Group
 EPG – European Programme Group
 EPS – Electrical Power Subsystem
 EPU – Electronics Processing Unit
 ER – enhanced radiation
 ER – extended range
 ERA – explosive reactive armour
 ERA – extended range ammunition
 ERC – Engin de Reconnaissance Canon
 ERFB – extended range full-bore
 ERFB-BB – extended range full-bore – base bleed
 ERGFCDS – Extended Range Gunnery Fire-Control Demonstration System
 ERGP – extended range guided projectile
 ERMIS – Extended Range Modification Integration System
 ERP – Extended Range Projectile
 ERSC – extended range subcalibre
 ERV – emergency rescue vehicle
 ERV – Engineer Reconnaissance Vehicle
 ES – Extreme Spread
 ESAF – Electronic Safety and Arm Function
 ESD – Electronique Serge Dassault
 ESLDE – Eyesafe Laser Daylight Elbow
 ESPAWS – Enhanced Self-Propelled Artillery Weapon System (US)
 ESRS – electro-slag refined steel
 ETA – Estimated Time of Arrival
 ETC – ElectroThermal Cannon
 ETD – Estimated Time of Departure
 ETE – Estimated Time of Endurance
 ETM – Electronic Technical Manuals
 ETS – Elevated TOW System
 ETS – Engineer Tank System
 ETS – End of Term of Service (discharge date) (US)
 EW  – electronic warfare
 EWK – Eisenwerke Kaiserslautern Gцppner
 EWS – external weapon station

F
 FAAD – Forward Area Air Defense
 FAAR – Forward Area Alerting Radar (US)
 FAARP – Forward Area Arming & Refueling Point
 FAASV – Field Artillery Ammunition Support Vehicle (US)
 FAC – Forward Air Control(er)
 FAC-A – Forward Air Control(er)-Airborne
 FACE – Field Artillery Computer Equipment
 FAL – Fusil Automatique Légère
 FAPDS – Frangible Armour-Piercing Discarding Sabot
 FARP – Forward Area Refueling Point
 FARS – field artillery rocket system
 FARV-A – Future Armored Resupply Vehicle – Artillery (US)
 FAST – Forward Area Support Team or Future Assault Shell Technology
 FAV – Fast Attack Vehicle (US)
 FBI – Federal Bureau of Investigation
 FBM – Fleet Ballistic Missile
 FBRV – Future Beach Recovery Vehicle (UK)
 FCC – Fire Command Centre
 FCC – Fire-Control Computer
 FCCVS – Future Close-Combat Vehicle System (US)
 FCE – fire-control equipment
 FCLV – Future Command and Liaison Vehicle (UK)
 FCS – fire-control system/subsystem
 FCS – Future Combat System
 FCU – Fire Control Unit
 FDC – fire direction centre
 FDCV – fire direction centre vehicle
 FDSWS – Future Direct Support Weapon System
 FEBA – Forward Edge of the Battle Area
 FEP – Firepower Enhancement Programme
 FET – Future Engineer Tank
 FFAR – Folding-Fin Aerial Rocket
 FFE – Fire for Effect
 FFR – Fitted For Radio
 FFSS – Future Fighting Soldier System
 FFW – Fitted For Wireless
 FG – field gun
 FH – field howitzer
 FIBUA – Fighting In Built-Up Areas
 FID – Foreign Internal Defense
 FIFV – Future Infantry Fighting Vehicle (US)
 FIRM – Floating Integrated Rail Mount
 FIS – Fuze Interface System
 FISH –  Fighting In Someone's House (UK) (Colloquial. Slang term for FIBUA)
 FIST – Future Integrated Soldier Technology (UK), Fire Support Team (US)
 FISTV – Fire Support Team Vehicle (US)
 FITOW – Further Improved TOW (US)
 FLEA – Frangible Low-Energy Ammunition (i.e. a fragmentation grenade or a low-yield IED)
 FLIR – forward-looking infra-red
 FLOT – forward line of own troops
 FLSW – Future Light Support Weapon
 FM – U.S. Army Field Manuals
 FM – Titanium tetrachloride (code designation)
 FMBS – Family of Muzzle Brake/Suppressors
 FMC – Food Machinery Corporation
 FMF – Fleet Marine Force
 FMJ – Full Metal Jacket
 FMJBT – Full Metal Jacket Boat Tail
 FMJLF – Full Metal Jacket Lead Free
 FMN - Federated Mission Networking
 FMPDS – Frangible Missile Piercing Discarding Sabot
 FMS – Foreign Military Sales
 FMTV – Family of Medium Tactical Vehicles
 FN – Fabrique Nationale (Manufacturer)
 FNG – Fucking New Guy
 FO – Forward Observer
 FOB – Forward Operating Base
 FOC – Full Operational Capability
 FOD – Foreign Object Damage (i.e., damage not caused by enemy fire. Includes bugs, dirt, etc.) (Aviation)
 FOG – Fibre Optic Gyro
 FOM – Fibre Optic Missile
 FOO – forward observation officer
 FORTIS – Forward Observation and Reconnaissance Thermal Imaging System
 FOTT – Follow On To TOW
 FOV – field of view
 FPA – Focal Plane Array
 FPL – Final Protective Fire
 FRAG – fragmentation
 FRAGO – FRAGmentary Order. (see OPORD)
 FRES – Future Rapid Effect System
 FROG – free rocket over ground
 FSCL – fire support coordination line
 FSCM – fire support coordination measure
 FSCV – fire support combat vehicle
 FS – fire support element
 FSED – full-scale engineering development (US)
 FSSG – Force Service Support Group
 FST – Future Soviet Tank/Follow-on Soviet Tank
 FSV – fire support vehicle
 FSV – Future Scout Vehicle (US)
 FTA – Frangible Training Ammunition
 FTMA – Future Tank Main Armament
 FTS – Future Tank Study
 FTT – Field Tactical Trainer
 FUBAR – Fouled/Fucked Up Beyond All Reason/Recognition/Repair
 FUE – First Unit Equipped
 FUG – Felderitц Usу Gépkosci
 FV – fighting vehicle
 FV/GCE – fighting vehicle gun control equipment
 FVDD – Fighting Vehicle Development Division
 FVRDE – Fighting Vehicle Research and Development Establishment (UK)
 FVS – Fighting Vehicle System (US)
 FVSC – Fighting Vehicle Systems Carrier (US)
 FY – fiscal year

G
 g – gramme(s)
 G – gendarmerie
 GAMA – Gun Automatic Multiple Ammunition
 GAO – General Accounting Office
 GAP – Gun Aiming Post
 GBAD – Ground Based Air Defence
 GCE – gun control equipment
 GCT – Grande Cadence de Tir (high rate of fire)
 GCU – Gun Control Unit
 GCW – Gross Combined Weight (not "Gross Combat Weight"). Gross Vehicle Weight (GVW) plus Gross Trailer Weight (GTW).
 GD – General Dynamics
 GDLS – General Dynamics Land Systems
 GDU – Gun Display Unit
 GFE – Government Furnished Equipment
 GH – gun-howitzer
 GIGN-Groupe d'intervention de la Gendarmerie Nationale ("National Gendarmerie Intervention Group")
 GIAT – Groupement Industriel des Armements Terrestres
 GL – Grenade Launcher
 GLATGM – Gun Launched Anti-Tank Guided Missile
 GLC – gun lay computer
 GLDNSM – Grenade Launcher Day-Night Sight Mount
 GLH-H – Ground-Launched Hellfire-Heavy (US)
 GLLD – Ground Laser Locator Designator (US)
 GLS – Gesellschaft für Logistischen Service
 GM, MVO – General Motors, Military Vehicle Operations
 GMC – General Motors Corporation
 GMG – Grenade Machine Gun
 GMLRS – Guided Multiple Launch Rocket System
 GMS – Gun Management System
 GND – Ground (electrical)
 GOCO – government-owned, contractor-operated (US)
 GOP – General Out Post
 GP – General Purpose
 GP – guided projectile
 GPMG – General Purpose Machine Gun
 GPO – gun position officer
 GPS – Global Positioning System
 GPS – gunner's primary sight
 GPSS – Gunner's Primary Sight Subsystem
 GR – Gajaba Regiment (Sri Lanka)
 GREM – Grenade Rifle Entry Munition
GRIT – Group, Range, Indication, Type of fire
 GRU – Glavnoe Razvedyvatel'noe Upravlenie, meaning Main Intelligence Directorate
 GSR – General Staff Requirement (US)
 GSRS – General Support Rocket System
 GSG9- Grenzschutzgruppe 9 der Bundespolizei (Border Protection Group 9 of the Federal Police)
 GSOF – Georgian Special Operations Forces
 GST – General Staff Target
 GST – Gesellschaft fьr System-Technik
 GTCS – Gun Test and Control System
 GTG – Good To Go
 GTI – German Tank Improvement
 GTW – Gross Trailer Weight
 GVW – Gross Vehicle Weight. Curb weight plus max payload weight.
 GW – Gemunu Watch (Sri Lanka)
 GW – guided weapon

H
 h – hour(s)
 H&K – Heckler and Koch
 HAB – Heavy Assault Bridge (US)
 HAB – Heavy Artillery Brigade (UK)
 HAG – Heavy Artillery Gun
 HAHO – High Altitude High Opening
 HALO – High Altitude Low Opening, High Activity/Low Observable
 HAMS – Headquarters and Maintenance Squadron – Marine Aircraft Group (USMC)
 HAWK – Homing-All-the-Way-Killer (US)
 HB – heavy barrel
 HBAR – Heavy Barrel Assault Rifle
 HC – Hexachloroethane/zinc
 HC – high-capacity
 HC – Hollow Charge
 HCER – high-capacity extended range
 HCHE – high-capacity high-explosive
 HCT – HOT Compact Turret
 HDS – HOLOgraphic Diffraction Sight
 HE – high-explosive
 HE-APERS – high-explosive anti-personnel
 HE-FRAG – high-explosive fragmentation
 HE-FRAG-FS – high-explosive fragmentation – fin-stabilised
 HE-FS – high-explosive – fin-stabilised
 HE-S – high-explosive spotting
 HE-T – high-explosive tracer
 HE/PR – high-explosive practice
 HEAA – High-Explosive Anti-Armour
 HEAB – High-Explosive Air Burst
 HEAP – High-Explosive Armor-Piercing
 HEAP-T – high-explosive anti-personnel – tracer
 HEAT – high-explosive anti-tank
 HEAT-FS – high-explosive anti-tank fin-stabilised
 HEAT-MP – high-explosive anti-tank multipurpose
 HEAT-MP(P) – high-explosive anti-tank multipurpose (practice)
 HEAT-T – high-explosive anti-tank – tracer
 HEAT-T-HVY – high-explosive anti-tank – tracer – heavy
 HEAT-T-MP – high-explosive anti-tank – tracer – multipurpose
 HEAT-TP-T – high-explosive anti-tank – target practice – tracer
 HED-D – Hybrid Electric Drive – Demonstrator
 HEDP – high-explosive dual-purpose
 HEER – High-Explosive Extended Range (US)
 HEF – high-explosive fragmentation
 HEFT –  High-Explosive Follow Through
 HEI – high-explosive incendiary
 HEIAP – High-explosive incendiary/armor-piercing ammunition
 HEIT – high-explosive incendiary tracer
 HEL – High-Energy Laser (US)
 HEL – Human Engineering Laboratory (US)
 HELP – Howitzer Extended Life Program (US)
 HEMAT – Heavy Expanded Mobility Ammunition Trailer (US)
 HEMP – High-Explosive Multi-Purpose
 HEMTT – Heavy Expanded Mobility Tactical Truck (US)
 HEP – high-explosive plastic
 HEP-T – high-explosive practice – tracer
 HEPD – high-explosive point detonating
 HERA – high-explosive rocket-assisted
 HESH – high-explosive squash head
 HESH-T – high-explosive squash head – tracer
 HET-PF – high-explosive tracer – percussion fuze
 HETF – High Explosive Time Fuzed
 HETS – Heavy Equipment Transport System
 HFCC – Howitzer Fire-Control Computer (US)
 HFHTB – Human Factors Howitzer TestBed (US)
 HFM – Heavy Force Modernisation (US)
 HIFV – Heavy Infantry Fighting Vehicle
 HIMAG – High-Mobility Agility Test Vehicle (US)
 HIMARS – High-Mobility Artillery Rocket System (US)
 HIP – Howitzer Improvement Program (US)
 HIRE – Hughes Infrared Equipment
 HITP – High-Ignition Temperature Propellant
 HIU – Heading Indicator Unit
 HMC – Howitzer Motor Carriage
 HMD – Helmet-Mounted Display
 HMG – Heavy Machine Gun
 HMH – Marine Heavy Helicopter Squadron
 HMLC – High-Mobility Load Carrier
 HML/A – Marine Light/Attack Helicopter Squadron
 HMM – Marine Medium Helicopter Squadron
 HMMWV – High Mobility Multipurpose Wheeled Vehicle
 HMX – Marine Special Mission Helicopter Squadron
 HOE – Holographic Optical Element
 HOT – Haute subsonique Optiquement Téléguidé
 How – Howitzer
 HP – High Power; Hollow Point
 hp – Horsepower
 HPFP – High-Performance Fragmentation Projectile
 HPS – Helmet Pointing System (or Sight)
 HPT – high-pressure test
 HRU – Heading Reference Unit
 HS – Headquarters Squadron – Marine Wing Support Group (USMC)
 HSS – Hunter Sensor Suite
 HSTV(L) – High-Survivability Test Vehicle (Lightweight) (US)
 HTTB – High-Technology TestBed (US)
 HVAP – high-velocity armour-piercing
 HVAP-T – high-velocity armour-piercing tracer
 HVAPDS – high-velocity armour-piercing discarding sabot
 HVAPDS-T – high-velocity armour-piercing discarding sabot – tracer
 HVAPFSDS – high-velocity armour-piercing fin-stabilised discarding sabot
 HVCC – High Velocity Canister Cartridge
 HVM – Hypervelocity Missile
 HVSS – horizontal volute spring suspension
 HVSW – Hypervelocity Support Weapon
 HVTP-T – high-velocity target practice – tracer
 HWSTD – High Water Speed Technology Demonstrator
 HYPAK – Hydraulic Power Assist Kit

I
 I – Incendiary
 IAF - Indian Air Force
 IAFV – infantry armoured fighting vehicle
 IAI – Israel Aircraft Industries
 IAL – Infrared Aiming Light
 IASD – Instant Ammunition Selection Device
 IBAS – Improved Bradley Acquisition System
 ICBM - Intercontinental ballistic missile
 ICC – information co-ordination centre
 ICM – Improved Conventional Munition
 ICM – BB improved conventional munition base bleed
 ICV – Infantry Combat Vehicle
 IDF – Israel Defense Forces
 IDF – Indirect fire
 IDW – Individual Defence Weapon
 IED – Improvised Explosive Device
 IEPG – Independent European Program Group
 IFCS – Improved/Integrated Fire-Control System
 IFF – Identification Friend or Foe
 IFV – infantry fighting vehicle
 IFVwCM – Infantry Fighting Vehicle with Integrated Countermeasures (US)
 IGLS – Individual Grenade Launcher System
 II – image intensification/intensifier
 IIR – Imaging Infra-Red
 ILL – illuminating
 ILMS – Improved Launcher Mechanical System
 ILS – Integrated Logistic Support
 IM – Insensitive Munition(s)
 IMMLC – Improved Medium Mobility Load Carrier
 IMSC - International Maritime Security Construct
 IMU – Inertial Measurement Unit
 INSAS – Indian Small Arms System
 InSb – Indium-antimonide
 INS -Indian Naval ship
 IOC – initial operational capability
 IOF – Indian Ordnance Factory
 IPB – Intelligence Preparation of the Battlefield
 IPF – Initial Production Facility
 IPO – International Programme Office
 IPPD – Integrated Product Process Development
 IR – Infra-Red
 IRBM – Intermediate-range ballistic missile
 IRU – Inertial Reference Unit
 IS – internal security
 ISD – In Service Date
 ISGU – Integrated Sight and Guidance Unit
 ISR – Intelligence Surveillance and Reconnaissance
 ISU – Integrated Sight Unit
 ISV – Internal Security Vehicle
 ITAS – Improved Target Acquisition System
 ITOW – Improved TOW
 ITPIAL – Infra-red Target Pointer/Illuminator/Aiming Laser
 ITT – Invitation To Tender
 ITV – Improved TOW Vehicle (US)
 IVPDL – Inter-Vehicle Positioning and Data Link (US)
 IW – Individual Weapon
 IWS – Improved Weapon System

J
 JBMoU – Joint Ballistic Memorandum of Understanding
 JDAM – Joint Direct Attack Munition
 JERRV – Joint Engineer Rapid Response Vehicle
 JGSDF – Japanese Ground Self-Defence Force
 JHP – Jacketed hollow point
 JMAC – Joint Medium-calibre Automatic Cannon
JOIR - Joint Operations Information Range
 JPO – Joint Project Office
 JSC – Joint Steering Committee
 JSCS – Joint Service Combat Shotgun
 JSDFA – Japanese Self-Defence Force Agency
 JSP – Jacketed Soft Point
 JSSAMP – Joint Services Small Arms Master Plan
 JSSAP – Joint Service Small Arms Program

K
 KAAV – Korean Armoured Amphibious Vehicle
 KAC – Knight's Armament Company
 KE – Kinetic energy
 KEC – Kaman Electromagnetics Corporation
 KEM – Kinetic Energy Missile (US)
 kg – kilogramme(s)
 KHA – Killed Hostile Action (US Vietnam War)
 KIA – Killed in Action
 KIFV – Korean Infantry Fighting Vehicle
 KNHA – Killed Non-Hostile Action (US Vietnam War)
 KPA – Korean People's Army

L
 LAAG – light anti-aircraft gun
 LAAM – Light Anti-Aircraft Missile
 LCAC – Landing Craft Air Cushion
 LAD – light aid detachment
 LADS – light air defense system (US)
 LAG – Light Artillery Gun
 LALO – Low Altitude Low Opening
 LAM – Laser Aiming Module
 LAPES – Low-Altitude Parachute Extraction System
 LAR – Light Automatic Rifle
 LASER – Light Amplification by Stimulated Emission of Radiation
 LASIP – Light Artillery System Improvement Plan
 LATS – Light Armoured Turret System
 LAU – Light Armoured Unit
 LAV – Light Armored Vehicle (US)
 LAV – Light Assault Vehicle (US)
 LAV-AD – Light Armored Vehicle – Air Defense
 LAW – Light Anti-tank Weapon
 LB – Long Barrel
 LC – Laser Collimator
 LCD – Liquid crystal display
 LCS – Loader Control System
 LCU – Landing Craft Utility
 LCV – Light Contingency Vehicle (LCV) (US)
 LD – Low drag, Line of Departure
 LE – Law Enforcement
 LED – light emitting diode
 LEP – Life Extension Programme
 LEU – Launcher Erector Unit
 LF – ATGW Light Forces' Anti-Tank Guided Weapon
 LF – Linked Feed
 LFHG – Lightweight Fragmentation Hand Grenade
 LFL – Light Fighter Lethality
 LIA – Linear Induction Accelerator
LIC – Low Intensity Conflict
 LIMAWS – Lightweight Mobile Artillery Weapon System
 LION – Lightweight Infra-red Observation Night sight
 LIW – Lyttleton Engineering Works
 LKP – Loader Keyboard Panel
 LLAD – low-level air defence
 LLLTV – low light level television
 LLM – Launcher Loader Module
 LMAW – Light Multi-purpose Assault Weapon
 LMG – Light Machine Gun
 LNS – Land Navigation System
 LNS – Laying and Navigation System
 L/O – Liaison Officer
 LOAL – Lock-On After Launch
 LOBL – Lock-On Before Launch
 LOC – Line Of Communication
 LOS – Line Of Sight
 LOSAT – Line Of Sight Anti-Tank
 LP – Liquid Propellant
 LP – Listening Post
 LPC – Launch Pod Container
 LPC – Launcher Pod Carrier
 LPG – Liquid Propellant Gun
 LPO – Leading Petty Officer
 LPT – Low-Profile Turret
 LPTS – Lightweight Protected Turret System
 LR – Long Rifle
 LR – Long-Range
 LRAR – Long Range Artillery Rocket
 LRASS – Long-Range Advanced Scout System
 LRAT – long-range anti-tank
 LRBB – long-range base bleed
 LRD – Long Range Deflagrator
 LRF – laser rangefinder
 LRF – Low Recoil Force
 LRHB – long-range hollow base
 LRIP – Low-Rate Initial Production
 LRM – Laser Rangefinder Module
 LRN – Lead Round Nose
 LRN – Low Recoil NORICUM
 LRRP – Long Range Reconnaissance Patrol
 LRSA – Long Range Sniper Ammunition
 LRSU – Long Range Surveillance Unit
 LRU – Launcher Replenishment Unit
 LRU – Line Replacement Unit
 LRU – Line-Replaceable Unit
 LSAT- Lightweight Small Arms Technologies
 LSB – Landing Support Battalion
 LSS – Lightweight Shotgun System
 LSVW – Light Support Vehicle, Wheeled (Canada)
 LSW – Light Support Weapon
 LTA – Launch Tube Assembly
 LTD – Laser Target Designator
 LTFCS – Laser Tank Fire-Control System
 LTP – Laser Target Pointer, Luminesant Training Projectile
 LUTE – Lightweight Uncooled Thermal Imager Equipment
 LVA – landing vehicle assault (US)
 LVS – Lightweight Video Sight
 LVT – Landing Vehicle Tracked (US)
 LVTC – Landing Vehicle Tracked Command (US)
 LVTE – Landing Vehicle Tracked Engineer (US)
 LVTH – Landing Vehicle Tracked Howitzer (US)
 LVTP – Landing Vehicle Tracked Personnel (US)
 LVTR – Landing Vehicle Tracked Recovery (US)
 LWC – Lead Wad Cutter
 LWIR – Long Wave Infrared
 LWL – LightWeight Launcher
 LWML – LightWeight Multiple Launcher
 LWMS – LightWeight Modular Sight
 LWS – laser warning system
 LWT – light weapon turret
 LZ – landing zone
 LRW – Light Repair Works (Indian Army)

M
 m – metre(s)
 m/s – metres per second
 MAB – Marine Amphibious Brigade
 MABS – Marine Air Base Squadron
 MAC – Medium Armored Car (US)
 MAC – Military Airlift Command
 MACS – Modular Artillery Charge System
 MACS – Marine Air Control Squadron
 MADLS – Mobile Air Defence Launching System
 MAF – Marine Amphibious Force
 MAG – Marine Aircraft Group
 MAGTEC – Marine Air/Ground Training & Education Command
 MAGTF – Marine Air/Ground Task Force
 MAHEM – Magnetohydrodynamic Explosive Munition
 MALOS – Miniature Laser Optical Sight
 MALS – Marine Air Logistics Squadron
 MAMBA – Mobile Artillery Monitoring Battlefield Radar
 MANPADS – Man Portable Air Defense System
 MAOV – Mobile Artillery Observation Vehicle
 MAP – Military Aid Programme
 MAPS – Modular Azimuth Position System
 MAR – Micro Assault Rifle
 MARDI – Mobile Advanced Robotics Defence Initiative (UK)
 MARDIV – Marine Division (US)
 MARS – Military Amateur Radio Station
 MARS – Mini Assault Rifle System
 MARS – Multi-purpose Aiming Reflex Sight
 MARS – Multiple Artillery Rocket System
 MASS – Marine Air Support Squadron
 MATCS – Marine Air Traffic Control Squadron
 MATSG – Marine Air Training Support Group
 MAU(SOC) – Marine Amphibious Unit (Special Operations Capable)
 MAV – maintenance assist vehicle
 MAVD – MLRS Aim Verification Device
 MAW – Marine Air Wing (US)
 MBA – main battle area
 MBB – Messerschmitt-Bцlkow-Blohm
 MBC – Mortar Ballistic Computer
 MBT – main battle tank
 MCISRE – Marine Corps Intelligence, Surveillance, and Reconnaissance Enterprise
 MCLOS – Manual Command to Line Of Sight
 MCRV – Mechanised Combat Repair Vehicle
 MCS – Microclimate Conditioning System
 MCS – modular charge system
 MCSK – Mine Clearance System Kit (US)
 MCT – Medium Combat Tractor (US)
 MCT – Mercury Cadmium Telluride
 MCV – Mechanised Combat Vehicle
 MCWL – Marine Corps Warfighting Laboratory
 MCWS – Minor Caliber Weapons Station (US)
 MDB – Multi Domain Battle
 MDMP – Military Decision Making Process
 MDU – Map Display Unit
 MEB – Marine Expeditionary Brigade
 MEDEVAC – Medical Evacuation
 MEF – Marine Expeditionary Force
 MENS – Mission Element Need Statement (US)
 MEP – Modular Explosive Penetrator
 MEPS – Military Entrance Processing Station
 METO – Middle East Treaty Organisation; CENTO or Baghdad Pact
 METL – Mission Essential Task List
 METT-TC – Mission, Enemy, Terrain and weather, Troops and support available—Time available, Civilians
 METT-TSL – Mission, Enemy, Terrain and weather, Troops and fire support available - Time available, Space, Logistics
 MEU – Marine Expeditionary Unit
 MEU(SOC) – Marine Expeditionary Unit (Special Operations Capable)
 MEV – medical evacuation vehicle (US)
 MEWS – Mobile Electronic Warfare System
 MEWSS – Mobile Electronic Warfare Support System
 MF – multifunction
 MFC – Mortar Fire Control(ler)
 MFCS – Multi-Fire Control System/Mortar Fore Control System
 MFCV – Missile Fire-Control Vehicle
 MFF – munition filling factory
 MG – machine gun
 MGB – Medium Girder Bridge
 MGL – Multiple Grenade Launcher
 MGS – Mobile Gun System
 MGTS – MultiGun Turret System
 MGU – Mid-course Guidance Unit
 MI – Military Intelligence
 MIA – Missing In Action
 MICOM – Missile Command (US)
 MICV – Mechanised Infantry Combat Vehicle
 MILAN – Missile d'Infantrie Léger Antichar (light infantry anti-tank missile)
 MILES – Multiple Integrated Laser Engagement System (US)
 MILSPEC – Military Specification
 MILSTD – MILitary STANdard
 MILSTAR – MILitary Strategic and Tactical Relay (US)
 MIPS – Medium Integrated Propulsion System (US)
 MIR - Mechanized Infantry Regiment (Sri Lanka)
 MIRV - Multiple independently targetable reentry vehicle
 MLA – Manufacturing Licence Agreement
 MLC – Military Load Class
 MLC – Modular Load Carrier
 MLF – Marine Logistics Force
 MLR – Marine Logistics Regiment
 MLI – Mid-Life Improvement
 MLO – Muzzle Loaded Ordnance
 MLRS – Multiple Launch Rocket System (US)
 mm – millimetre(s)
 MMBF – mean miles between failures
 MMG – Medium Machine Gun
 MMS – mast-mounted sight
 MMS – Modular Mounting System
 MNVD – Monocular Night Vision Device
 MoA – Memorandum of Agreement
 MOA – Minute Of Angle
 MoD – Ministry of defence
 MODA – Ministry of Defence and Aviation
 MOLF – Modular Laser Fire Control (Germany)
 MOLLE – MOdular Lightweight Load-carrying Equipment
 MOPP – Mission Oriented Protective Posture (US)
 MOS – Military Occupational Specialty (US)
 MoU – Memorandum of Understanding
 MOUT – Military Operations in Urban Terrain (urban warfare) (US)
 MP – Machine Pistol
 MP - Military police
 MPBAV – MultiPurpose Base Armoured Vehicle
 MPC – MultiPurpose Carrier (Netherlands)
 MPDS – Missile Piercing Discarding Sabot
 MPGS – Mobile Protected Gun System (US)
 MPI – Mean Point of Impact
 MPIM – MultiPurpose Individual Munition
 MPM – MultiPurpose Munition
 MPS – Maritime Prepositioning Ships (US)
 MPV – Multi-Purpose Vehicle
 MPWS – Mobile Protected Weapon System (US)
 MR – Medium Range
 MRAP – Mine Resistant Ambush Protected (Vehicle)
 MRAR – MultiRole Assault Round
 MRAV – MultiRole Armoured Vehicle
 MRBF – mean rounds before failure
 MRBS – mean rounds between stoppages
 MRE –  Meal Ready to Eat
 MRS – multiple rocket system
 MRS – muzzle reference system
 MRSI – Multiple Round Simultaneous Impact
 MRV(R) – Mechanised Recovery Vehicle (Repair)
 MRVR – Mechanised Repair and Recovery Vehicle (US)
 MSSG – MAU/MEU Service Support Group (USMC)
 MSL – Missile
 MSR – Missile Simulation Round
 MSR – Main Supply Route
 MSTAR – Man-portable Surveillance and Target Acquisition Radar
 MSV – Modular Support Vehicle
 MT – mechanical time
 MTB – Mobility TestBed
 MTBF – Mean Time Between Failure
 MTI – moving target indication
 MTL – Materials Technology Laboratory (US)
 MTR – Mobile Test Rig (US)
 MTSQ – mechanical time and super-quick
 MTSQ – Mechanical Time Semi-Quick
 MTU – Motoren- und Turbinen-Union
 MTVL – mobile tactical vehicle light
 MUGS – Multipurpose Universal Gunner Sight
 MULE – Modular Universal Laser Equipment (US)
 MUSS – Multifunctional Selfprotection System
 MV – muzzle velocity
 MVEE – Military Vehicles and Engineering Establishment (UK)
 MVRS – Muzzle Velocity Radar System
 MWCS – Marine Wing Communications Squadron
 MWHS – Marine Wing Headquarters Squadron
 MWS – Manned Weapon Station (US)
 MWS – Modular Weapon System
 MWSG – Marine Wing Support Group
 MWSS – Marine Wing Support Squadron

N
 NATO – North Atlantic Treaty Organization
 NAVSEA – Naval Sea Systems Command
 NBC – Nuclear, Biological, Chemical
 NBMR – NATO Basic Military Requirement
 NCIS – Naval Criminal Investigative Service (US)
 NCO – Non-Commissioned Officer (US, E-4 – E-9)
 NCOIC – Non-Commissioned Officer In Charge
 NDI – Non-developmental item
 NDU – Navigation Display Unit
 NFOV – Narrow Field Of View
 NG – New/Next Generation
 Ni/Cd – Nickel Cadmium
 NLAW – Next Light (weight) Anti-armour Weapon
 NLOS-C – Non-Line Of Sight-Cannon
 NLOS-M – Non-Line Of Sight-Mortar
 NOD(s) – Night Observation Device(s)
 NOTAM – Notice to Airmen
 NRF – NATO Response Force
 NS – Network Services
 NTC – National Training Center (USA)
 NUGP – nominal unit ground pressure
 NV – Night Vision
 NVD – Night Vision Device
 NVE – Night Vision Equipment
 NVESD – Night Vision and Electronic Sensors Directorate
 NVG – Night Vision Goggle
 NVS – Night Vision System
 NZDF – New Zealand Defence Force
 NZEF – New Zealand Expeditionary Force (in WWI & WWII)
 NZSAS - New Zealand Special Air Service

O
 OBR – Optical Beam-Riding
 OCC – Obus à Charge Creusé (shaped-charge shell)
 OCOKA – Observation and fields of fire, Cover and concealment, Obstacles, Key terrain, and Avenues of Approach.
 OCSW – Objective Crew-Served Weapon
 OCU – Operational Centre Unit
 ODE – Ordnance Development and Engineering (Singapore)
 OEG – Occluded Eye Gunsight (a type of Collimator sight)
 OEO – optical and electro-optical
 OFSA – Objective Family of Small Arms
 OFSA – One Size Fits All
 OFW – Objective Force Warrior
 OHWS – Offensive Hand Weapon System
 OIC – Officer In Charge
 OICW – Objective Individual Combat Weapon
 OOTW – Operations Other Than War
 OP – Observation post
 OP – Operators Panel
 OPCON – OPerational CONtrol
 OPDW – Objective Personal Defense Weapon
 OPORD – OPerations Order
 OPSEC – OPerational SECurity
 OPV – Observation Post Vehicle
 OSW – Objective Sniper Weapon
 OSC – Operation Strategy Command
 OSS (USAF) – Operational Support Squadron
 OSW (USAF) – Operational Support, Weather
 OT – operational test
 OTA – overflight top attack
 OTEA – Operational Test and Evaluation Agency (US)

P
 P – How pack howitzer
 P-38 — P-38 can opener (US)
 P3I – Pre-Planned Product Improvements
 PAR – pulse acquisition radar
 PAT – power-assisted traverse
PAWPERSO – Protection, Ammunition, Weapon, Personal Equipment, Radio, Specialist Equipment, Orders
 PC – Personal Computer
 PCB – printed circuit board
 PCC – Police Compact Carbine
 PCI –  Pre-combat inspection
 PD – Point Defense
 PD – point detonating
 PD – Point of Departure
 PDNA – Positioning Determining/Navigation Unit
 PDRR – Program Definition and Risk Reduction
 PDW – Personal Defence Weapon
 PE – MoD Procurement Executive (UK)
 PE – Peace Enforcement (US DoD)
 PEC – Printed Electronic Circuits
 PFD – proximity fuze disconnector
 PFHE – prefragmented high-explosive
 PLF – protective line of fire
 PFPX – prefragmented proximity fuzed
 PGMM – Precision Guided Mortar Munition
 PH – Probability of Hit
 Pi – Probability of incapacitation
 PIAT – Projector, Infantry, Anti Tank
 PIBD – Point Initiating Base Detonated
 PID – Positive Identification
 PIE – pyrotechnically initiated explosive
 PIP – Product Improvement Programme
 PL – Phase Line
 PLA – People's Liberation Army
 PLARS – Position Location And Reporting System (US)
 PLC – Programmable Logic Control
 PLO – Palestinian Liberation Army
 PLOS – Predicted Line Of Sight
 PLS – Palletized Load System (US)
 PM – porte mortier (mortar carrier)
 PM – Product Manager
 PMCS – Preventative Maintenance Checks and Services
 PMEE –  Prime Mission Electronic Equipment (USAF)
 PMO – Program Management Office (US)
 PMO – Provost Marshall's Office
 PMOD – Platform Modifications
 PMS – Pedestal-Mounted Stinger
 PNU – Position Navigation Unit
 POA&M – Plan Of Action & Milestones
 POF – Pakistan Ordnance Factory
 POG – Person other than Grunt
 POS – Postes Optiques de Surveillance
 POW – Prisoner of War
 PPG – PT Parade Games (Bangladesh Cadet Colleges)
 PPI – plan position indicator
 PPS – Precise Positioning Service
PPV – Protected Patrol Vehicle
 PRAC – practice
 PRAC-T – practice tracer
PRESAR – Preparation, React to enemy fire, Establish enemy position, Suppress the enemy, Assault, Reorg
 PRI – projector reticle image
 PRP – Personnel Reliability Program (screening and monitoring of individuals with access to "special" weapons)
 PSBC – Platoon Sergeant's Battle Course
 PSD – Propulsion System Demonstrator
 PSO – Peace Support Operations
 PSS – Primary Sight System
 PTO – power take-off
 PVP – Petit Véhicule Protégé
 PW – Prisoner of War
 PWI-SR(GR) – Panser Wagen Infanterie-Standaard (Groep)
 PWP – Plasticised White Phosphorus
 PWR – Power

Q
 QCB – Quick Change Barrel
 QE – Quadrant Elevation
 QRF – Quick Reaction Force

R
 RA – Royal Artillery
 RAA – Royal Australian Artillery
 RAAM – Rifle-launched Anti-Armour Munition
 RAAMS – Remote Anti-Armor Mine System (US)
 PABD – Pay Entry Base Date
 RAC – Royal Armoured Corps
 RADIRS – Rapid Deployment Multiple Rocket System (US)
 RAAF – Royal Australian Air Force
 RAE – Royal Aircraft Establishment, Royal Aircraft Establishment (Farnborough)
 RAE – Royal Australian Engineers, Australian Combat Engineers
 RAF – Royal Air Force
 RAM-D – reliability, availability, maintainability and durability
 RAN – Royal Australian Navy
 RAO – Rear Area Operations
 RAP – Regimental Aid Post
 RAP – rocket-assisted projectile
 RAPI – Reactive Armour Protection
 RARDE – Royal Armament Research and Development Establishment (UK)
 RATAC – Radar de Tir pour L'Artillerie de Campagne (radar for field artillery fire)
 RATELO – Radio Telephone Operator
 RAW – Rifleman's Assault Weapon
 RBL – Range and Bearing Launch
 RBOC – Rapid Bloom Offboard Chaff
 RC/MAS – Reserve Component/Modified Armament System
 RCAAS – Remote-Controlled Anti-Armor System (US)
 RCAF – Royal Canadian Air Force
 RCC – ROLAND Coordination Center (US)
 RCWS – Remote-Controlled Weapon Station
 RCL – Recoilless rifle
 RCN – Royal Canadian Navy
 RCS – Radar Cross Section
 RCT – Regimental Combat Team
 RCT – Royal Corps of Transport
 RCV – Robotic Command Vehicle
 RDF – Rapid Deployment Forces
 RDF/LT – Rapid Deployment Force Light Tank (US)
 RDJTF – Rapid Deployment Joint Task Force (US)
 RDT&E – Research Development Test and Evaluation
 REME – Royal Electrical and Mechanical Engineers
 REMF – Rear Echelon Mother Fucker
 RF – Rimfire
 RFA – Royal Field Artillery or Royal Fleet Auxiliary
 RFAS – Russian Federation and Associated States
 RFC – Royal Flying Corps
 RFI – request for information
 RFP – request for proposals
 RFPI – Rapid Force Projection Initiative
 RFQ – Request For Quotations
 RGGS – Rifle Grenade General Service
 RHA – rolled homogeneous armour
 RHA – Royal Horse Artillery
 RIN – the former Royal Indian Navy
 RIS – Rail Interface System
 RISE – Reliability Improved Selected Equipment
 RLC – Royal Logistic Corps
 RLEM – Rifle-Launched Entry Munition
 RLG – Ring Laser Gyro
 RLT – Regimental Landing Team
 RMG – ranging machine gun
 RN – Royal Navy
 RNZAF – Royal New Zealand Air Force
 RNZN – Royal New Zealand Navy
 RO – Royal Ordnance
 ROBAT – Robotic Counter-Obstacle Vehicle (US)
 RoC – Republic of China
 ROC – required operational characteristics
 ROE – Rules Of Engagement
 ROF – Royal Ordnance Factory (UK)
 ROF – Rate of fire
 RoK – Republic of Korea
 RoKMC – Republic of Korea Marine Corps
 RoKIT – Republic of Korea Indigenous Tank
 ROR – range only radar
 ROTA – Royal Ordnance Training Ammunition
 RP – Red phosphorus
 RP – rocket-propelled
 RP - Regimental police
 RPC – Rocket Pod Container
 RPG – Rocket-propelled grenade
 RPG – Ruchnoy Protivotankovy Granatomyot
 RPV – Remotely piloted vehicle
 RR – Recoilless rifle
 RRPR – Reduced Range Practice Rocket
 RRT – Radio Recon Team
 RRTR – Reduced Range Training Round
 RSAF – Royal Small Arms Factory (UK) (now closed)
 RSN – Role Specialist Nation (US & NATO)
 RSS – Rosette Scanning Seeker
 RTE – Rifle Team Equipment
 RTO – Radio/Telephone Operator
 RTT – Roues Transporteur de Troupes
 RUC – Royal Ulster Constabulary
 RWS – Remote weapon system (or station)

S
 s – second(s)
 S&W – Smith & Wesson
 SA – Situation Awareness
 SABCA – Société Anonyme Belge de Constructions Aéronautiques
 SABR – Selectable Assault Battle Rifle
 SABS – Stabilizing Automatic Bomb Sight
 SAC – Small Arms Collimator
 SACLOS – Semi-Automatic Command to Line Of Sight
 SADA – Standard Advanced Dewar Assembly
 SADARM – Sense And Destroy Armor (US)
 SADF – South African Defence Force
 SAE – Society of Automotive Engineers
 SAF – Small Arms Fire
 SAFCS – Small Arms Fire Control System
 SAFIRE – Surface-to-Air Fire
 SAL – semi-active laser
 SAL – search and locate
 SAM – surface-to-air missile
 SAMM – Société d'Applications des Machines Motrices
 SANDF – South African National Defence Force
 SANG – Saudi Arabian National Guard
 SAP – Semi-Armour-Piercing
 SAPHEI – Semi-Armour-Piercing High Explosive Incendiary
 SAPI – semi-armour-piercing incendiary or Small Arms Protective Insert
 SAR – Search and Rescue
 SAS – Special Air Service
 SASR – Special Air Service Regiment
 SAS-EAS – Sealed Authenticator System – Emergency Action Procedures (Nuclear Weapons Release Control)
 SASR – Special Application Sniper Rifle
 SAT – Small Arms Trainer
 SATCP – Systиme Anti-aérien à Trиs Courte Portée (very short-range anti-aircraft system)
 SAVA – Standard Army Vectronics Architecture
 SAW – Squad Automatic Weapon
 SAWS – Squad Automatic Weapon System
 SB – Short Barrel
 SCORE – Stratified Charge Omnivorous Rotary Engine
 SCC,-Sea Cadet corps
 SD – self-destruct(ion)
 SEAD – Suppression of Enemy Air Defenses
 SEAL – Sea/Air/Land
 SEALOCK – Search, Locate, and Communicate or Kill
 SEATO – Southeast Asia Treaty Organisation
 SEME – School of Electrical and Mechanical Engineering
 SEN – shell extended range NORICUM
 SEP – Soldier Enhancement Programme
 SF – Special Forces (US/UK)
 SFCS – Simplified Fire-Control System
 SFIM – Société de Fabrication d'Instrument de Mesure
 SFIRR – solid fuel integral rocket/ramjet
 SFM – Sensor Fuzed Munitions
 SFMG – Sustained Fire Machine Gun
 SFSW – Special Forces Support Weapon
 SFW – Special Forces Weapon
 SGTS – Second-Generation Tank Sight
 SH/PRAC – squash head practice
 SHORAD – Short-Range Air Defence System
 shp – shaft horsepower
 SIC – Second in Command
 SICPS – Standard Integrated Command Post Systems
 SINCGARS – Single Channel Ground/Air Radio System
 SIP – System Improvement Plan/Programme
 SIPS – Small Integrated Propulsion System
 SITREP – Situation Report
 SJFN – Semi-Jacketed Flat Nose
 SJHP – Semi-Jacketed Hollow Point
 SKOT – Sredni Kolowy Opancerzny Transporter (armoured personnel carrier)
 SLA - Sri Lanka Army
 SLAC - Sri Lanka Armoured Corps
 SLAF - Sri Lanka Air Force
 SLAGSE - Sri Lanka Army General Service Corps
 SLAOC - Sri Lanka Army Ordnance Corps
 SLAPC - Sri Lanka Army Pioneer Corps
 SLASC - Sri Lanka Army Service Corps
 SLAWC - Sri Lanka Army Women's Corps
 SLCG - Sri Lanka Coast Guard
 SLCMP - Sri Lanka Corps of Military Police
 SLE - Sri Lanka Engineers
 SLEME - Sri Lanka Electrical and Mechanical Engineers
 SLLI - Sri Lanka Light Infantry
 SLMC - Sri Lanka Army Medical Corps
 SLNG - Sri Lanka National Guard
 SLN - Sri Lanka Navy
 SLRC - Sri Lanka Rifle Corps
 SLSR - Sri Lanka Sinha Regiment
 SLAP – saboted light armor penetrator
 SLAW – Shoulder-Launched Assault Weapon
 SLEP – Service Life Extension Program (US)
 SLR – Self-Loading Rifle
 SLR – Super Low Recoil
 SLWAGL – Super Light Weight Automatic Grenade Launcher
 SM – smoke
 SMAW – Shoulder-launched Multi-purpose Assault Weapon
 SMG – sub-machine gun
 SMK – Smoke
 SMP – Surface Mine Plough
 SMU – Special Mission Unit
 SNAFU – Situation Normal, All Fouled Up
 SNCO – Staff Non-Commissioned Officer (USMC, E-6 – E-9)
 SNCOIC – Staff Non-Commissioned Officer In Charge (USMC)
 SOCOM – Special Operations Command
 SOF – Special Operations Forces
 SOG – Speed Over Ground
 SOP – Standing/Standard Operating Procedure(s)
 SOS – Struck Off Strength 
 SP – Shore Patrol
 SP – self-propelled
 SP – Soft Point
 SPAAG – self-propelled anti-aircraft gun
 SPAAM – self-propelled anti-aircraft missile
 SPAG – self-propelled assault gun
 SPARK – solid propellant advanced ramjet kinetic energy missile
 SPAS – Special Purpose Automatic Shotgun, like SPAS-12 or SPAS-15
 SPATG – self-propelled anti-tank gun
 SPAW – self-propelled artillery weapon
 SPG – self-propelled gun
 SPH – self-propelled howitzer
 SPL – self-propelled launcher
 SPLL – Self-propelled Loader Launcher
 SPLY – Supply
 SPM – self-propelled mortar
 SPP – Special Purpose Pistol
 SPR – Special Purpose Rifle
 SPS – Standard Positioning Service
 SPSM – Sensorgezundete Panzerabwehr SubMunition
 SPW – Special Purpose Weapon
 SR – Short Rifle
 SR – Staff Requirement
 SR – Special Reconnaissance
 SRR – Special Reconnaissance Regiment
 SRAW – Short Range Assault Weapon
 SRC – Space Research Corporation
 SRG – shell replenishment gear
 SRI – Short Range Insert
 SRTS – Short Range Thermal Sight
 SRU – Shop Replaceable Unit
 SRU – Slip Ring Unit
 SRV – Surrogate Research Vehicle (US)
 SS – Submarine
 SSA – Special Spaced Armour
 SSE – Sensitive Site Exploitation
 SSG – Single Shot Gun
 SSK – Single Shot Kill
 SSR – Sniper Support Rifle
 SSR – Special Support and Reconnaissance Company (DNK)
 SSW – Squad Support Weapon
 ST6 - Seal Team Six
 ST – Staff Target
 STA – shell transfer arm
 STAB – Steered Agile Beams
 STAFF – Small Target Activated Fire-and-Forget (US)
 STANAG – STANdardisation Agreement
 STARTLE – Surveillance and Target Acquisition Radar for Tank Location and Engagement (US)
 STE/ICE – Simplified Test Equipment/Internal Combustion Engine (US)
STF - Special Task Force
 STOVL – Short Take Off and Vertical Landing
 STUP – spinning tubular projectile
 SUB – SUBstitute
 SUC – Square Ultra Compact
 SUIT – Sight Unit Infantry Trilux
 SUSAT – Sight Unit Small Arms Trilux
 SWARM – Stabilised Weapon and Reconnaissance Mount
 SWAT – Special Weapons And Tactics
 SWC – Semi WadCutter
 SWS – Sniper Weapon System

T
 T – Tracer
 TAAR –  Tactical Air to Air Refueling
 TACBE – Tactical beacon
 TACMS – Army Tactical Missile System (US)
 TACOM – Tank-automotive and Armaments Command (US)
 TACP - Tactical Air Control Party
 TAD – Temporary Additional Duty (Naval Services term) Temporary Duty
 TADDS – Target Alert Display Data Set (US)
 TADS – Target Acquisition and Designation System (US)
 TAM – Tanque Argentino Mediano
 TAS – Target Acquisition Subsystem
 TAS – tracking adjunct system
 TAS – Turret Attitude Sensor
 TBAT – TOW/Bushmaster Armored Turret (US)
 TC – Tank Commander, also Truck Commander (US Army)
 TCO – Tactical Combat Operations
 TCTO – Time-Compliance Technical Order
 TCU – tactical control unit
 TD – Tank Destroyer
 TDCS – Tank Driver Command System
 TDD – Target Detection Device
 TDR – Target Data Receiver
 TDY – Temporary Duty
 TE – Tangent Elevation
 TEL – Transporter-Erector-Launcher
 TELAR – Transporter-Erector-Launcher And Radar
 TES – Tactical Environment Simulation
 TES – target engagement system
 TGMTS – Tank Gunnery Missile Tracking System
 TGP – Terminally Guided Projectile
 TGP – Targeting pod
 TGS – Tank Gun Sight
 TGSM – terminally guided submunition
 TGTS – tank gunnery training simulator
 TI – thermal imaging/imager
 TIC – Troops In Contact
 TICM – thermal imaging common modules
 TIIPS – Thermal Imaging and Integrated Position System
 TIM – Thermal Imaging Module
 TIPU – Thermal Image Processing Units
 TIRE – Tank Infra-Red Elbow
 TIS – thermal imaging system
 TLC – Transport Launching Container
 TLD – Top Level Demonstrations
 TLE – Treaty Limited Equipment
 TLP – Troop Leading Procedures (US)
 TLR – Tank Laser Rangefinder
 TLS – Tank Laser Sight
 TM&LS – Textron Marine & Land Systems
 TMBC – Turret Management Ballistic Computer
 TMP – Tactical Machine Pistol
 TMS – Turret Modernisation System
 TMUAS – Turreted Mortar Under Armor System (US)
 TNI - Tentara Nasional Indonesia
 TNT – Trinitrotoluene
 TO – Technical Order
 TOE – Table of organisation and equipment
 TOGS – Thermal Observation and Gunnery System (UK)
 TOP – Total Obscuring Power
 TOPAS – Transporter Obrneny Pasovy
 TOTE – Tracker, Optical Thermally Enhanced
 TOW – Tube-launched, Optically tracked, Wire command link guided (US)
 TP – Target Practice
 TP-FL – target practice flash
 TP-S – or TPS Target Practice-Spotting/Signature
 TP-SM – target practice – smoke
 TP-SP – target practice – spotting
 TP-T – target practice – tracer
 TPCM – Target Practice Colour-Marking
 TPDS – Target Practice Discarding Sabot
 TPFSDS-T – target practice fin-stabilised discarding sabot – tracer
 TPTF – Target Practice Time Fuzed
 TR – Triple Rail
 TRACER – Tactical Reconnaissance Armoured Combat Equipment Requirement (UK)
 TRACKSTAR – Tracked Search and Target Acquisition Radar System (US)
 TRADOC – Training and Doctrine Command (US)
 TSFCS – Tank Simplified Fire-Control System
 TSQ – time and super-quick
 TSR – Tavor Sporting Rifle
 TT – transport de troupes (troop transporter)
 TTB – Tank TestBed (US)
 TTD – Transformation Technology Demonstrator
 TTG – Time To Go
 TTS – Tank Thermal Sight
 TU – Terminal Unit
 TU – Traversing Unit
 TUA – TOW Under Armor (US)
 TUR – Tiefflieger-Ьberwachungs-Radar (low-level surveillance radar)
 TV – Television
 TWD – Thermal Warning Device
 TWMP – Track Width Mine Plough
 TWS – Thermal Weapon Sight
 TYDP – Ten Year Defence Programme (Australia)

U
 UAV – Unmanned Aerial Vehicle
 UBLE – Universal Bridge Launching Equipment
 UCVP – Universal Combat Vehicle Platform
 UDR – Ulster Defence Regiment
 UET – Universal Engineer Tractor (US)
 UGV – Unmanned Ground Vehicle
 ULC – Unit Load Container
 UMA – Universal Mounting Adapter
 UMP – Universal Machine Pistol
 USA – United States of America/United States Army
 USAADS – U.S. Army Air Defense School
 USAARMS – U.S. Army Armor School
 USAAVNS – U.S. Army Aviation School
 USAAF – United States Army Air Forces
 USAF – United States Air Force
 USCG – United States Coast Guard
 USMC – United States Marine Corps
 USN – United States Navy
 USP – Universal Self-loading Pistol
 UTL – Universal Tactical Light
 UTM – Universal Transverse Mercator
 UTS – Universal Turret System
 UV – Ultraviolet
 UW – Urban warfare

V
 V – Volt(s)
 VAB – Véhicule de l'Avant Blindé (front armoured car)
 VAB – Vickers Armoured Bridgelayer
 VADS – Vulcan Air Defense System (US)
 VAE – Vehiculo Armado Exploracion
 VAK – Vehicle Adaptor Kit
 VAPE – Vehiculo Apoyo y Exploracion
 VARRV – Vickers Armoured Repair and Recovery Vehicle
 VARV – Vickers Armoured Recovery Vehicle
 VBC – Véhicule Blindé de Combat (armoured combat vehicle)
 VBCI – Véhicule Blindé de Combat d'Infanterie
 VBIED – Vehicle-Borne Improvised Explosive Device
 VBL – Véhicule Blindé Léger (light armoured vehicle)
 VBM – Véhicules Blindés Modulaires
 VBSS – Visit Board Search Seizure
 VC – Vehicle Commander
 VCA – Véhicule Chenillé d'Accompagnement (tracked support vehicle)
 VCC – Veicolo Corazzato de Combattimento
 VCG – Véhicule de Combat du Genie (armoured engineer vehicle)
 VCI – Véhicule de Combat d'Infanterie; Vehiculo combate infanteria (infantry combat vehicle)
 VCP – Vehicle Check Point
 VCR – variable compression ratio
 VCR – Véhicule de Combat à Roues (wheeled combat vehicle)
 VCR/AT – Véhicule de Combat à Roues/Atelier Technique (salvage)
 VCR/IS – Véhicule de Combat à Roues/Intervention Sanitaire (stretchers)
 VCR/PC – Véhicule de Combat à Roues/Poste de Commandement (HQ)
 VCR/TH – Véhicule de Combat à Roues/Tourelle HOT (turret with four HOT ATGW)
 VCR/TT – Véhicule de Combat à Roues/Transport de Troupes (troop carrier)
 VCTIS – Vehicle Command and Tactical Information System
 VCTM – Vehiculo de Combate Transporte de Mortero (armoured mortar carrier)
 VCTP – Vehiculo de Combate Transporte de Personal (armoured personnel carrier)
 VDA – Véhicule de Défense Anti-aérienne (anti-aircraft defence vehicle)
 VDAA – Véhicule d'Auto-Défense Anti-aérienne
 VDC – Voltage Direct Current
 VDM – viscous damped mount
 VDSL – Vickers Defence Systems Ltd
 VDU – visual display unit
 VEC – Vehiculo de Exploraciòn de Caballerie
 VEDES – Vehicle Exhaust Dust Ejection System (US)
 VERDI – Vehicle Electronics Research Defence Initiative (UK)
 VHIS – visual hit indicator system
 VIB – Véhicule d'Intervention du Base
 VIDS – Vehicle Integrated Defence System
 VINACS – Vehicle Integrated Navigation and Command System
 VIRSS – Visual and InfraRed Smoke Screening System
 VITS – Video Image Tracking Systems
 VLAP – Velocity-enhanced Long-range Artillery Projectile
 VLC – Véhicule Léger de Combat (light armoured car)
 VLI – Visible Light Illuminator
 VLSMS – Vehicle-Launched Scatterable Mine System
 VMA – Marine Light Attack Squadron
 VMA(AW) – Marine All-Weather Attack Squadron
 VMBT – Vickers Main Battle Tank
 VMF – Marine Fighter Squadron
 VMFA – Marine Fighter Attack Squadron
 VMFA(AW) – Marine All-Weather Fighter Attack Squadron
 VMGR – Marine Aerial Refueler/Transport Squadron
 VMFP – Marine Aerial Reconnaissance Squadron
 VMM – Marine Tilt-rotor (MV-22B) Squadron
 VMU – Marine Unmanned Aerial Vehicle Squadron
 VMR – Marine Transport Squadron
 VMAQ – Marine Electronic Warfare Attack Squadron
 VMS – Vehicle Motion Sensor
 VNAS – Vehicle Navigation Air System
 VRL – Véhicule Reconnaissance Léger (light reconnaissance vehicle)
 VSEL – Vickers Shipbuilding and Engineering Ltd
 VT – variable time (fuse)
 VTOL – Vertical Take-Off and Landing aircraft
 VTP – véhicule transport de personnel (personnel carrier)
 VTT – véhicule transport de troupe (troop transporter)
 VVSS – vertical volute spring suspension
 VXB – Véhicule Blindé à Vocations Multiples (multipurpose armoured car)

W
 WAAC – Women's Auxiliary Army Corps and individual members of; obsolete
 WAC – Women's Army Corps and individual members of; obsolete
 WAF – Women (in the) Air Force and individual members of; obsolete
 WAM – Wide Area Mines (US)
 WAMI – Wide Area Motion Imagery (US)
 WAPC – Wheeled Armoured Personnel Carrier (Canada)
 WASAD – Wide Angle Surveillance and Automatic Detection Device
 WAV – Wide Angle Viewing
 WAVES – Women Accepted for Volunteer Emergency Service (USN); obsolete
 WES – Wing Engineer Squadron (USMC)
 WFOV – Wide Field Of View
 WFSV – Wheeled Fire Support Vehicle (Canada)
 WHA – Wounded Hostile Action (US Vietnam War)
 WHA – Weapons Head Assembly
 WHSA – Weapons Head Support Assembly
 WLR – Weapon Locating Radar
 WM – Woman/Women Marine(s)
 WMD – Weapon(s) of Mass Destruction
 WMRV – Wheeled Maintenance and Recovery Vehicle (Canada)
 WNHA – Wounded Non-Hostile Action (US Vietnam War)
 WP – white phosphorus
 WP-T – white phosphorus – tracer
 WSM – Winchester Short Magnum
 WTS – Wing Transportation Squadron (USMC)

X
 XO – Executive Officer

Y
 YMRS – Yugoslav multiple rocket system

Z
 ZULU – Zulu time (timezone equivalent to UTC)

See also
 List of established military terms
 List of military tactics
 Glossary of firearms terminology
 Military Abbreviations www.marx-mil.com by Stefan Marx

References
 Armor and Artillery Glossary
 Infantry Weapons Glossary
 FM 17-97 Cavalry Troop (October 1995)
 FM 5-19 (formerly FM 100–14) Composite Risk Management (21 Aug 2006)
 Military abbreviations and Dictionaries
 Military acronyms and military abbreviations

Military lists
 
Glossary
Wikipedia glossaries using unordered lists